PorchLight Entertainment, Inc. was an American animation and live-action studio founded in 1995 by Bruce D. Johnson and William T. Baumann. It is focused on development & production of television series in both live action and animation. It specializes in producing animation for television, film and home video.

History 
On February 20, 1995, PorchLight Entertainment officially began its operations. It was headed by Bruce D. Johnson, former employee of Hanna-Barbera, and former Taft Broadcasting employee William T. Baumann. Their first acquisition is to bring Adventures from the Book of Virtues to television. Their project was then picked up by PBS, who ordered it to their series commitment.

In 1997, while on the virtue of its own successful programming, it would spend $10 million on expanding its own programming activity and planning on to do made-for-TV movies. In 1998, it launched a motion picture division, PorchLight Pictures, which specialized on having motion picture distribution.

In 2000, it bought the international film, TV and distribution rights to the motion picture, Heartwood. In 2001, it signed a deal with Columbia TriStar Home Entertainment to distribute titles based on Jay Jay the Jet Plane. In 2004, it was acquired by their senior management and Beringea through Global Rights II, through its parent company, PorchLight Worldwide, Inc.

In 2011, Bruce D. Johnson, one of PorchLight's co-founders, started Foxfield Entertainment.

In 2018, PorchLight Entertainment was acquired by Trilogy Animation Group.

Filmography
 Animation 
64 Zoo Lane
A Martian Christmas
Adventures from the Book of Virtues
Animalia
Cedric
The Eggs
Four Eyes!
Gofrette                                                                                  
Jay Jay the Jet Plane (CGI)
JetCat
Kid Paddle
LeapFrog
Mr. Frog & Mrs. Frog's Big Day Out
The Haunted Pumpkin of Sleepy Hollow
The Secret Saturdays
Tutenstein
 Live-action
Night of the Twisters
Born Champion
Pope Dreams
I Downloaded a Ghost
Rain

See also
 LeapFrog

References 

Mass media companies established in 1995
Mass media companies disestablished in 2011
Television production companies of the United States
American animation studios